Posthouse may refer to:

Post office
 Alternative written form of Post house (historical building)